"I Only Have Eyes for You" is a romantic love song by composer Harry Warren and lyricist Al Dubin, written for the film Dames (1934) when Dick Powell introduced it. Several successful recordings of the song were made in 1934; later, there were charted versions by The Flamingos (1959) and Art Garfunkel (1975).

Charting versions

Popular 1934 versions
Ben Selvin (vocal by Howard Phillips), Eddy Duchin (vocal by Lew Sherwood), and Jane Froman.

The Flamingos version

The Flamingos recorded a doo-wop adaptation of "I Only Have Eyes for You" at Bell Sound Studios in New York City in 1958. Their version was commercially successful, peaking at number 11 on the US Billboard Hot 100 chart and number 3 on the Billboard Hot R&B/Hip-Hop Songs chart. This recording has become recognised as a genre-defining work and has been frequently included in numerous lists; it was ranked as the 73rd biggest hit of 1959 by Billboard, while Rolling Stone magazine placed it at number 158 on their list of the "500 Greatest Songs of All Time".

This version was used in a commercial for Amazon Alexa and was featured in The Crown (season 2) and Euphoria (American TV series). It was also featured in the 2018 thriller Breaking In.

Cliff Richard version
A 1964 recording by Cliff Richard and the Norrie Paramor Orchestra peaked at number 31 on the Australian chart.

The Lettermen version
A 1966 recording by The Lettermen went to number 4 on the US Easy Listening chart and number 72 on Hot 100.

Jerry Butler version
In 1972, Jerry Butler's version on Mercury records spent eight weeks on the Billboard R&B chart, reaching a positional high of number 20. It also charted in the Billboard Hot 100, reaching number 85.

Art Garfunkel version

A recording of the song by Art Garfunkel was a number-one hit on the UK Singles Chart in October 1975 for two weeks. In the US, the song reached number 18 on the U.S. Billboard Hot 100 and No. 1 on the Billboard Adult Contemporary chart. Garfunkel performed "I Only Have Eyes for You" on the second episode of Saturday Night Live.

Other selected notable versions
The song has been recorded by many artists, including Billie Holiday (1952), Roy Eldridge (Sept 15, 1954), Frank Sinatra (1962), Sunny Ozuna (1968), Robert Knight (1970), David Porter (1970), Carmen McRae (1972), Jermaine Jackson (1972), The Escorts (1973), Erroll Garner (1974), Eddie Floyd (1977), The Main Ingredient (1981), Billy Paul (1985), Zapp (1985), Etta James (1999), George Benson (2000), Carly Simon (2005), Summer Camp (2009), Tashaki Miyaki (2015), and Boyz II Men (2017).

References
Notes

Sources
 The Billboard Book of Top 40 Hits, 6th Edition, 1996

1930s jazz standards
1934 songs
1950 singles
1959 singles
1966 singles
1975 singles
Art Garfunkel songs
Vikki Carr songs
The Flamingos songs
The Lettermen songs
Jerry Butler songs
Song recordings produced by Richard Perry
Carmen McRae songs
UK Singles Chart number-one singles
Pop standards
Songs with music by Harry Warren
Songs with lyrics by Al Dubin
Songs written for films
End Records singles
Columbia Records singles